Balca may refer to:

 Balca, Bayburt, a village in the district of Bayburt, Bayburt Province, Turkey
 Bâlca, a village in the commune Coțofănești, Bacău County, Romania
 Bâlca, a tributary of the Trotuș in Bacău County, Romania